Cyrus Skinner was an Old West outlaw and brother to outlaw George Skinner. They were involved in the 1856 theft of $80,000 of gold bullion along with Big Dolph Newton, Bill Carter, Rattlesnake Dick, Romera (or Romero) Carter, and an unidentified Mexican. The theft was unsuccessful when Cyrus and Dick missed the rendezvous having been captured with stolen mules. George buried half the money. The other half was turned over to the law by Carter, but George, having been killed in the capture, never revealed the location of the other $40,000 in gold which presumably remains hidden in the Trinities.

Cyrus Skinner escaped imprisonment with Rattlesnake Dick there and again in Auburn, California. Skinner was hanged by vigilantes in Montana in 1864.

References

Outlaws of the American Old West